John Ashdjian (born 13 September 1972) is an English former footballer who played in the Football League for Scarborough.

External links
 

English footballers
English Football League players
1972 births
Living people
Northampton Town F.C. players
Scarborough F.C. players
Kettering Town F.C. players
Association football wingers